"Meteorite" is a song by British synthpop trio Years & Years. It written by band members Olly Alexander, Mikey Goldsworthy, and Emre Türkmen for the soundtrack to the 2016 British romantic comedy film Bridget Jones's Baby, while production was helmed by Years & Years along with Mark Ralph. It was released as the second single from the soundtrack on 13 September 2016, following Ellie Goulding's "Still Falling for You".

Formats and track listings
Digital download
"Meteorite" – 3:25

Digital download
"Meteorite" (Acoustic) – 4:03

Digital download
"Meteorite" (TIEKS Remix) – 5:04
"Meteorite" (Kideko Remix) – 3:53
"Meteorite" (Fakear Remix) – 3:36

Charts

Release history

References

External links

2016 songs
2016 singles
Years & Years songs
Polydor Records singles
Bridget Jones
Songs written by Olly Alexander
Songs written for films
Song recordings produced by Mark Ralph (record producer)